Joshua Raymond Bohui (born 3 March 1999) is an English professional footballer who plays as a forward for  club Sevenoaks Town. He is a product of the Brentford and Manchester United academies and began his senior career in the Netherlands with NAC Breda. Following a spell with EFL club Colchester United, he dropped into non-League football in 2021. He was capped by England at U17 level.

Club career

Youth career: Brentford and Manchester United
After beginning his youth career at the Evolution Sports & Health Academy in London, Bohui entered the youth system at Brentford in 2011. He progressed through the youth ranks and was part of the U15 team which won the Junior Globe at the 2014 Milk Cup. He made his youth team debut during the 2014–15 season and scored two goals in 12 appearances. Bohui signed a scholarship deal at the end of the 2014–15 season and scored nine goals in 22 appearances for the youth team during the 2015–16 season. He also broke into the Development Squad, making 13 appearances and scoring one goal. Due to the closure of the Brentford academy at the end of the 2015–16 season, Bohui had his contract terminated by mutual consent on 28 July 2016.

On 7 August 2016, Bohui joined the academy at Manchester United on a three-year contract. He progressed through the U18 team to the club's U23 team, but he twice rejected a new four-year contract and was released when his contract expired at the end of the 2018–19 season.

NAC Breda 
On 5 July 2019, Bohui moved to the Netherlands to join Eerste Divisie club NAC Breda on a two-year contract, with the option of two further years. A knee injury suffered that same month kept him out until November 2019 and he made four appearances before the 2019–20 season was ended early. Bohui was transfer-listed in June 2020, but he began the 2020–21 season with four appearances and one goal, prior to his contract being terminated by mutual consent on 5 October 2020.

Colchester United
On 10 October 2020, Bohui returned to England to sign a contract with League Two club Colchester United on a free transfer. He made 13 appearances before being dropped from manager Steve Ball's matchday squads in mid-January 2021. Bohui returned to the substitutes' bench in late April and scored his first goal for the club on his first appearance for nearly five months, with the only goal of the game versus Salford City on 1 May, which secured the Us' League Two status. He finished the season with 15 appearances and one goal and was released when his contract expired.

Non-League football 
In September 2021, Bohui transferred to Southern League First Division Central club Waltham Abbey. He made a single first team appearance and transferred to Southern League Premier Division South club Hayes & Yeading United on 23 November 2021. He made just two appearances in five weeks with Hayes & Yeading United and departed to join Isthmian League Premier Division club Leatherhead in January 2022. Following four appearances and a friendly appearance on trial for League of Ireland Premier Division club Sligo Rovers in February 2022, Bohui made a single appearance for Southern League Premier Division South club Chesham United in March 2022.

Bohui began the 2022–23 season with Southern Combination League First Division club Dorking Wanderers B. After scoring five goals in nine appearances, he transferred to National League South club Cheshunt on 7 October 2022. After making just one appearance, Bohui transferred to Isthmian League South East Division club Sevenoaks Town later that month.

International career 
Bohui is eligible to play for England, France or Ivory Coast at international level. He was invited to a training camp with the England under-16 team in January 2015 and won three caps for the under-17s during the second half of the 2015–16 season, with two coming during the Young Lions' unsuccessful 2016 UEFA European U17 Championship campaign.

Personal life 
Bohui was born to an English mother and an Ivorian father. He attended Ark Evelyn Grace Academy.

Career statistics

References

External links

Joshua Bohui at thefa.com

Joshua Bohui at southern-football-league.co.uk

Living people
English footballers
Association football forwards
1999 births
Manchester United F.C. players
England youth international footballers
Black British sportsmen
English people of Ivorian descent
Brentford F.C. players
English expatriate footballers
English expatriates in the Netherlands
Expatriate footballers in the Netherlands
NAC Breda players
Eerste Divisie players
Colchester United F.C. players
English Football League players
Waltham Abbey F.C. players
Hayes & Yeading United F.C. players
Southern Football League players
Leatherhead F.C. players
Isthmian League players
Chesham United F.C. players
Cheshunt F.C. players
National League (English football) players
Sevenoaks Town F.C. players